
Gmina Bukowiec is a rural gmina (administrative district) in Świecie County, Kuyavian-Pomeranian Voivodeship, in north-central Poland.

Villages
Gmina Bukowiec contains the villages and settlements of Bramka, Branica, Budyń, Bukowiec, Franciszkowo, Gawroniec, Jarzębieniec, Kawęcin, Korytowo, Krupocin, Plewno, Poledno, Polskie Łąki, Przysiersk, Różanna and Tuszynki.

Neighbouring gminas
Gmina Bukowiec is bordered by the gminas of Drzycim, Lniano, Pruszcz, Świecie and Świekatowo.

References
Polish official population figures 2006

Bukowiec
Świecie County